The Alfa Romeo 75 (Type 161, 162B), sold in North America as the Milano, is a compact executive car produced by the Italian automaker Alfa Romeo between 1985 and 1992. The Alfa 75 was commercially quite successful: in only three years, 236,907 cars were produced, and by the end of production in 1992, around 386,767 had been built.

The Alfa Romeo 75 was the last model released before Alfa Romeo was acquired by Fiat. (The Alfa Romeo 164 was the last model developed independently.)

Overview
The 75 was introduced in May 1985 to replace the Giulietta (with which it shared many components), and was named to celebrate Alfa's 75th year of production. The body, designed by head of Centro Stile Alfa Romeo Ermanno Cressoni, was styled in a striking wedge shape, tapering at the front with square headlights and a matching grille (similar features were applied to the Cressoni-designed 33).

At the 1986 Turin Auto Show, a prototype 75 estate was to be seen, an attractive forerunner of the later 156 Sportwagon. This version was, however, never listed for sale, being cancelled after Fiat took control of Alfa Romeo. The car, dubbed the 75 Turbo Wagon, was made by Italian coachbuilder Rayton Fissore using a 75 Turbo as the basis. Two estate versions were to be found at the later 1987 Geneva Motor Show; one was this Turbo Wagon and the other was a 2.0-litre version named the Sportwagon.

Technical features
The 75 featured some unusual technical features, most notably the fact that it was almost perfectly balanced from front to rear. This was achieved by using a transaxle configuration — mounting a standard five-speed gearbox and clutch in the rear, integrated with the rear differential (rear-wheel drive). The front suspension was a torsion bar and shock absorber combination and the rear an expensive de Dion tube assembled with shock absorbers; these designs were intended to optimise the car's handling; moreover, the rear brake discs were fitted at the centre of the rear axle, near the gearbox-differential group. The engine crankshaft was bolted directly to the two-segment driveshaft, which ran the length of the underside of the car, from the engine block to the gearbox, and rotated at the speed of the engine. The shaft segments were joined with elastomeric 'doughnuts' to prevent vibration and engine/gearbox damage. The 2.0 litre Twin Spark and the 3.0 litre V6 were equipped with a limited slip differential.

The 75 featured a then-advanced dashboard-mounted diagnostic computer, called Alfa Romeo Control, capable of monitoring the engine systems and alerting drivers of potential faults.

The 75 engine range at launch featured four-cylinder 1.6, 1.8 and 2.0 litre petrol carbureted engines, a 2.0 litre intercooled turbodiesel made by VM Motori, and a 2.5 litre fuel injected V6. In 1986, the 75 Turbo was introduced, which featured a fuel-injected 1.8 litre twin-cam engine using Garrett T3 turbocharger, intercooler and oil cooler.

In 1987, a 3.0 litre V6 was added to the range and the 2.0 litre Alfa Romeo Twin Cam engine was redesigned to have now two spark plugs per cylinder, which engine was named "Twin Spark". With fuel injection and variable valve timing this engine produced . This was an early example of a production engine using variable valve timing, though the first to do so was in Alfa Romeo's own Spider in 1980.  In North America, where the car was known as the Milano, only the 2.5 and 3.0 V6 engines were available, from 1987 to 1989.

The North American 2.5 litre engines were fundamentally different from their European counterparts.  Due to federal regulations, some modifications were required. Most noticeable from the outside were the 'America' bumpers, with the typical rubber accordions in them.  Furthermore, these bumpers had thick (and heavy) shock-absorbing material inside them, and in addition, they were mounted to the vehicle on shock absorbers.  To accommodate these shock absorbers, the 'America'-bodies were slightly different from the European ones.  Other changes relative to the European model were:
 Side-markers in the bumpers
 Exhaust silencer sticking out from under the bumper on the r/h side of the vehicle instead of at the centre
 Reinforcements in the doors (side impact bar) and boot lid
 Hooks underneath the bonnet (engine hood), to keep the bonnet in position in a crash

The North American cars also had optional levels of equipment (depending on the version: Milano Silver, Gold, Platinum, or Verde).  L/h and r/h electrically adjustable outside mirrors, electrically reclining seats and cruise control were usually optional in Europe.  The car was also available with a 3-speed ZF automatic gearbox option for the 2.5 V6. Other, more common options such as electrically operated rear windows and an A/C system were standard in the USA.  The USA-cars also had different upholstery styles and of course different dashboard panels indicating speed in mph, oil pressure in psi and coolant temperature in degrees F, and as a final touch, the AR control was different, and included a seat belt warning light. Some North American specification Milanos were sold in Switzerland (When catalytic converters were made mandatory in 1987).

The European-spec 2.5 V6 (2.5 6V Iniezione or 2.5QV) was officially sold only between 1985 and 1987, although some of them were not registered until 1989. Relatively few of them were sold (about 2,800 units), especially when the  1.8 Turbo got launched, which in some countries was cheaper in taxes because of its lower displacement. To better differentiate between the V6 and the inline fours, the 2.5 was bored out to 2,959 cc's to deliver  and this new engine was introduced as the 3.0 America in 1987.  As its type designation suggests, the 3.0 only came in the US-specification, with the impact-bumpers and in-boot fuel tank.  However, the European 'Americas' were not equipped with side-markers or the door, bonnet and boot lid reinforcements.  Depending on the country of delivery, the 3.0 America might be equipped with a catalytic converter.

In 1988, engines were updated again, the 1.8 L carburetor version was replaced with a fuel injected 1.8 and a new and bigger diesel engine was added to the range.  At the end of 1989 the 1.6 L carburetor version was updated to have fuel injection and in 1990 the 1.8 L turbo and 3.0i V6 got some more power and updated suspension. The 3.0 V6 was now equipped with a Motronic digital fuel injection system instead of the previous analog electronic L-Jetronic injection system. The 1.8L turbo was now also available in 'America'-spec, but strangely enough, was not available in the USA market. The 3.0 V6 did make it to the United States, and was sold as the Milano Verde.

Turbo Evoluzione

500 examples of the Turbo Evoluzione were produced in the spring of 1987 to meet Group A requirements. The car had many modifications when compared to the standard turbo model. The engine was down-sleeved to 1,762 cc (normally 1,779 cc) and while the claimed power was the same as in the standard turbo, this engine was better suited to power upgrades than was the standard 75 Turbo engine.

Engines

Motorsports

Alfa Romeo and its racing department Alfa Corse raced the 75 Turbo Group A in the World Touring Car Championship in the 1987 season. There were six official entries, two were run directly by Alfa Corse, two by Brixia Corse, one by Albatech, and one by the Swedish team Q-Racing. Team drivers included Formula One veterans such as Nicola Larini, Gabriele Tarquini, Alessandro Nannini, Jacques Laffite, and Mario Andretti as well as World Sportscar champion Jean-Louis Schlesser. The Class 2 car had enough power (approximately ) to be on par with the new and more track focused BMW M3. However, Alfa had very little success in the WTCC and with the whole season descending into a political farce, Alfa Romeo team boss Cesare Fiorio withdrew the team before the overseas races.

Australian driver Colin Bond, winner of the 1975 Australian Touring Car Championship and 1969 Hardie-Ferodo 500, had been racing the GTV6 since 1984. Remaining loyal to Alfa Romeo, he ran a Caltex sponsored Alfa 75 in the 1987 Australian Touring Car Championship, replacing the GTV6. Bond's new 75 was built by the Italian Luigi team, but Bond found that the engine produced about  rather than the promised . This saw him finish in a distant 9th place in the championship while the team's engine builder, Melbourne based Alfa expert tuner Joe Beninca, tried to reclaim the lost . This was finally achieved by converting the car to right hand drive, allowing for an exhaust system that did not wind around the steering rack. Bond also drove the end of season endurance races including the Bathurst race of the WTCC. After Bond qualified in 21st, co-driver Lucio Cesario destroyed the front of the 75 in a crash at the top of the mountain on lap 34 of the race, forcing the car's withdrawal from the Calder Park and Wellington races of the WTCC. The car was repaired in time for the Australian Grand Prix support races in Adelaide where Bond qualified for a second place start and finished 5th in the car's "down under" swansong. Bond was the only driver to embrace the 75 in Australia but switched to race the all-conquering Ford Sierra RS500 starting in 1988 in a bid to return to the winners circle.

Gianfranco Brancatelli won the 1988 ITC series with Alfa 75 Turbo and Giorgio Francia placed second in the 1991 ITC. The 9th Giro d'Italia automobilistico in 1988 was won by the team of Miki Biasion, Tiziano Siviero and Riccardo Patrese with a 75 Turbo Evoluzione IMSA. A 75 Turbo Evoluzione IMSA also won the 10th Giro d'Italia automobilistico in 1989.

The British Alfa Romeo Dealer Team ran a pair of cars in the 1986-87 seasons with drivers Rob Kirby and John Dooley. Racing in Class B, the team started with the V6 version of the 75, alongside their older GTV6, before upgrading to the 75 turbo. They were able to match the pace of the Ford Escort RS turbos but once Frank Sytner's BMW M3 appeared, they were rendered uncompetitive.

References

External links

 1987 Alfa Romeo 75 3.2 V6 Racing Car - giant-killer on test
 Alfa Romeo Bulletin Board & Forums
 Alfa Romeo Milano Registry
   UK based but worldwide forum for 75 owners
 Alfa GTV6 website and forum that also caters for 75 owners

75
Compact executive cars
Sports sedans
Rear-wheel-drive vehicles
1990s cars
Cars introduced in 1985
Touring cars
Cars discontinued in 1992